Tommy Sims  is an American bassist, songwriter, record producer and bandleader.

Music career 
From 1987 to 1989 Sims was the bassist for the Christian rock band White Heart, which he left to become a studio musician and producer. During 1992-1993, he played bass on the Bruce Springsteen 1992–1993 World Tour. As a songwriter he co-wrote Eric Clapton's "Change the World", which won the Grammy Award for Song of the Year in 1997. Other songs of his have been recorded by Bonnie Raitt, Susan Tedeschi, Garth Brooks, Cher, Blackstreet, Toni Braxton and BabyFace, among others. Sims has also worked with Michael Bolton, Amy Grant, Kelly Clarkson, Carman, CeCe Winans, Israel Houghton, Michael W. Smith, The Neville Brothers, Michelle Williams of Destiny's Child, Brian Courtney Wilson and others.

Television and film contributions 
In addition to writing and producing, Sims also released a solo album in August 2000, entitled Peace and Love. A song from this release, "It Don't Matter to the Sun", was featured on the soundtrack of the hit television drama Grey's Anatomy. Sims' film contributions include Bruce Springsteen's recording "Streets of Philadelphia", which appeared in the film Philadelphia, widely regarded as the first major film to deal openly with subject of AIDS and gay rights. The film and the song went on to be heavily recognized at the following year's Academy Awards, garnering several "Oscars", including the Best Song trophy. His song, Change The World", was also featured in the film Phenomenon. While winning a Grammy Award for Song of the Year, it was rendered ineligible for nomination at that year's Academy Awards, because of its prior release by Wynonna Judd. Sims had songs featured in several other blockbuster films, including For Love Of The Game and Where the Heart Is. He made a cameo appearance in Down Under the Big Top (1996), a short film by the Newsboys.

Notable projects 
 Amy Grant – Heart in Motion, House of Love & Behind the Eyes
 Carman – "The Standard" (1993) & "R.I.O.T. (Righteous Invasion of Truth)" (1996)
 Bruce Springsteen – In Concert/MTV Plugged, "Streets Of Philadelphia"
 Garth Brooks – The Life of Chris Gaines & "Retrospective"
 Michael McDonald – Blue Obsession
 Kenny Loggins – It's About Time
 BlackStreet – Another Level
 Toni Braxton – The Heat
 Robert Randolph and the Family Band – "ColorBlind"
 Taylor Swift – Speak Now
 Rachael Lampa – Rachael Lampa
 Bonnie Raitt – "Silver Lining", "Souls Alike" & "I Can't Help You Now"
 Kelly Clarkson – Thankful
 Newsboys – Shine: The Hits
 Taylor Dayne – Naked Without You
 Natalie Grant – Deeper Life
 Michelle Williams – Do You Know
 Marvin Winans – Alone But Not Alone
 Darwin Hobbs – Worshipper, Broken & Vertical 
 Israel and New Breed – Real & "The Power of One"
 Jonny Lang – "Fight for My Soul" (2013)
 Brian Courtney Wilson – "Just Love"
 Cece Winans – Let Them Fall in Love & "You Will"

Discography 
 Peace and Love – released August 15, 2000 by Universal Motown Records, a division of UMG Recordings, Inc.

"Which Way (Intro)"
"100"
"New Jam"
"When You Go"
"Summer"
"Write One"
"Alone"
"The Way It Used to Be"
"Comin' Home"
"The Ballad of Sophie"
"It Don't Matter"
"Love's Patience"
"Peace and Love"
"Which Way"

Grammy Awards 
 Love God. Love People. The London Sessions – Best Pop / Contemporary Gospel Album (2010)
 Power of One – Best Pop / Contemporary Gospel Album (2009)
 "Change the World" – Song of the Year / New Song of the Year (1996)

References

External links 
 Tommy Sims on Soul Walking

American male musicians
Grammy Award winners
Living people
Place of birth missing (living people)
Year of birth missing (living people)
White Heart members
African-American musicians
21st-century African-American people